Trinidad and Tobago is divided into nine regions, three boroughs, two city corporations and one ward.

Trinidad
The following are the municipalities and regions created after the amendment of Act No.8 of 1992:

The following regions were merged after the amendment of Act No.8 of 1992:

Before 1990 Trinidad was divided into eight counties.

Tobago
Tobago is a ward of Trinidad and Tobago and is governed locally by the Tobago House of Assembly.

Historically, Tobago was divided into seven parishes (Saint Andrew, Saint David, Saint George, Saint John, Saint Mary, Saint Patrick and Saint Paul). In 1768 each parish of Tobago had nominated representatives to the Tobago House of Assembly.  On 20 October 1889 the British crown implemented a Royal Order in Council constituting Tobago as a ward of Trinidad, thus terminating local government on Tobago and formed a unified colony government.

In 1945 when the county council system was first introduced, Tobago was administered as a single county of Trinidad.

In 1980 provisions were made for the Tobago House of Assembly to be revived as an entity providing local government in Tobago.  Under the revived system, Tobago is made up of 15 local electoral districts since 2021, previously 12 districts, with each district electing one Assemblyman to the THA.

See also
 ISO 3166-2:TT
List of Caribbean First-level Subdivisions by Total Area
Commonwealth Local Government Forum-Americas

Notes

References
 2000 Census: Total Population by Sex, Sex Ratio and Area 2000

External links
Ministry of Local Government Website
San Fernando City Corporation

 
Subdivisions of Trinidad and Tobago
Trinidad and Tobago, Regions
Trinidad and Tobago 1
Regions, Trinidad and Tobago
Trinidad and Tobago geography-related lists
Government of Trinidad and Tobago
 
Trinidad and Tobago

de:Trinidad und Tobago#Verwaltungsgliederung